The 1905 Chicago Maroons football team was an American football team that represented the University of Chicago during the 1905 Western Conference football season. In coach Amos Alonzo Stagg's 14th year as head coach, the Maroons finished with an 11–0 record (7–0 against Western Conference opponents), shut out 10 of 11 opponents, and outscored all opponents by a total of 271 to 5. The team played its home games at Marshall Field on the school's campus. 

There was no contemporaneous system in 1905 for determining a national champion. However, Chicago was retroactively named as the national champion by the Billingsley Report, the Helms Athletic Foundation, the National Championship Foundation, and the Houlgate System.

End Mark Catlin Sr. was the team captain. Two Chicago players, Catlin and quarterback Walter Eckersall, were consensus first-team selections on the 1905 All-American football team.  Other notable players included fullback Hugo Bezdek and center Burton Pike Gale, both of whom were selected by Walter Camp as third-team players on the All-America team. 

Three persons associated with the team have been inducted into the College Football Hall of Fame. Stagg and Eckersall were part of the Hall's first class of inductees in 1951. Bezdek was added, based on his coaching accomplishments, in 1954.

Schedule

Game summaries

Chicago 2, Michigan 0

The game, dubbed "The First Greatest Game of the Century," broke Michigan's 56-game unbeaten streak.  The 1905 Michigan team had outscored opponents 495-0 in its first 12 games. The game was lost in the final ten minutes of play when Denny Clark was tackled for a safety as he attempted to return a punt from behind the goal line.  Newspapers described Clark's play as "the wretched blunder" and a "lapse of brain work." Clark transferred to M.I.T. the following year and was haunted by the play for the rest of his life.  In 1932, he shot himself, leaving a suicide note that reportedly expressed hope that his "final play" would atone for his error at Marshall Field in 1905.

The game was played in halves of 35 minutes each.

Roster

 Head coach: Amos Alonzo Stagg (14th year at Chicago)

References

Chicago
Chicago Maroons football seasons
College football national champions
Big Ten Conference football champion seasons
College football undefeated seasons
Chicago Football